Renae Maihi is a New Zealand film director and screenwriter. She is best known for her work on the films Waru and  We Are Still Here, both of which premiered at the Toronto International Film Festival in 2017 and 2022 respectively.

Life and career 
Maihi was born in Auckland, New Zealand. She is Māori of the Ngāpuhi and Te Arawa tribes as well as NZ European.

In 2009, Maihi made her writing debut with Nga Manurere, starring Keisha Castle-Hughes. In 2010, she made her screenwriting debut with short film, Redemption, which premiered at the 60th Berlin International Film Festival and Sundance Film Festival. Her play, Patua, about child abuse won Adam NZ Play Award for best play by a Maori Playwright 2013, and her directorial theatre debut garnered critical acclaim in New Zealand. She subsequently wrote and directed the short film, Butterfly (Purerehua), funded by the New Zealand Film Commission. Butterfly premiered as part of the ImagineNATIVE Film Festival Māori spotlight in 2013 and screened in a programme alongside Taika Waititi’s Two Cars One Night. In 2015, her short film, Mannahatta, premiered at ImagineNATIVE Film Festival in Toronto. Mannahatta was later selected as a finalist for "Best Short Film" at the New Zealand International Film Festival. During 2015, she worked on series 2 of My Kitchen Rules NZ as the Talent coordinator.

Maihi's feature film, Waru, which she co-wrote and co-directed in collaboration with 8 other Māori women filmmakers was made up of a series of vignettes which addressed the widespread issue of child abuse in New Zealand. The film premiered at the Toronto International Film Festival, won the audience award at Seattle International Film Festival and the grand jury award for an outstanding international narrative feature at the 34th Asia-Pacific Film Festival in Los Angeles. It was also screened at the Wairoa Māori Film Festival, where it won the Indigenous Rights award.

In 2018, she was awarded the NZFC Maori Screen Excellence Award and Whakapapa Film Festival of Italy Award. Her films were screened as part of a retrospective on Māori filmmakers at Auckland's first Māori Film Week and the New Zealand International Film Festival.

She directed one of the segments of the anthology film We Are Still Here, which premiered as the opening film of the 2022 Sydney Film Festival and had its North American premiere in the Contemporary World Cinema program at the 2022 Toronto International Film Festival. We Are Still Here won Best Dramatic Feature Film at the 2022 imagineNATIVE Film Festival in Toronto.

Bob Jones v Renae Maihi 
For Waitangi Day in 2018, Bob Jones wrote an opinion piece calling for an annual "Māori Gratitude Day", where among other things he suggested that Māori serve breakfast in bed to Europeans as Māori owe their existence to British migrants. The opinion piece was published in the National Business Review on 2 February and caused so much outrage that it was soon deleted from their website. In response, Maihi started a petition calling for Bob to be stripped of his knighthood (received as a Knight Bachelor in the 1989 Queen's Birthday Honours) and on 27 March 2018, the petition (with then 68,000 signatures) was presented to parliament and received by MPs Kiri Allan and Willie Jackson. In a seven to four majority decision in April 2018, the New Zealand Media Council did not uphold a complaint about the opinion piece, but noted that the National Business Reviews decision to no longer publish columns by Jones was an "appropriate response to the justified public outrage".

In June 2018, Jones filed defamation papers with the Wellington High Court, seeking a ruling that the language used in Maihi's petition defamed him. Also in June 2018, community campaigner Laura O'Connell Rapira started a crowdfunding campaign for Maihi's legal costs. The court hearing was set for 10 to 21 February 2020. In his initial cross examination, Jones admitted that he had never read the petition that he claims defames him.

On 14 February 2020 Jones withdrew the case.

Personal life
Maihi has one son Dallas born in 2001. She identifies as bisexual and has been in a relationship with emerging First Nations Canadian filmmaker Judith Schuyler since 2017.

Filmography

Theatre
 Nga Manurere
 Patua
 Good Medicine

Awards and nominations

References

External links

Living people
New Zealand women film directors
New Zealand film directors
New Zealand screenwriters
New Zealand women screenwriters
Year of birth missing (living people)
Ngāpuhi people
Te Arawa people
New Zealand Māori writers
New Zealand Māori women
People from Auckland
Māori-language film directors